Cyril Hart may refer to:

Cyril Edwin Hart, forestry expert
Cyril Roy Hart, historian of Anglo-Saxon England